Tajwal Tarli is a village in Khyber Pakhtunkhwa province of Pakistan. It is located at 34°1'0N 73°20'30E with an altitude of 1563 metres (5131 feet).

References

Villages in Khyber Pakhtunkhwa